Adam Piccolotti (born August 23, 1988) is an American mixed martial artist currently competing in Bellator's Lightweight division.

Background
Born and raised in Half Moon Bay, California, Piccolotti competed in wrestling, baseball, and track and field at Half Moon Bay High School. In wrestling, he was a league champion and state tournament qualifier. Piccolotti also holds an accomplished background competing in Brazilian jiu-jitsu.

Mixed martial arts career

Early career
Piccolotti made his professional MMA debut in November 2013 after a 2-0 amateur career. He competed exclusively in Dragon House, a promotion based in the San Francisco Bay Area, for the first year of his career.

After compiling an undefeated record of 4–0, Piccolotti signed with Bellator.

Bellator MMA
Piccolotti made promotional debut against Andrew Ramm at Bellator 133 on February 13, 2015. The bout took place at a catchweight of 160 lbs. He won the fight via unanimous decision.

In his next bout, Piccolotti met Salvador Becerra at the inaugural "Dynamite" event, Bellator MMA & Glory: Dynamite 1, on September 19, 2015. He won the fight via neck crank submission in the second round.

Piccolotti faced Mario Soto on December 4, 2015, at Bellator 147. He won the fight via submission, due to a rear-naked choke, in the second round.

Piccolotti was scheduled to face Jordan Parsons at Bellator 154 on May 14, 2016. This bout did not occur, however, as Parsons was struck in a hit-and-run incident and ultimately succumbed to his injuries. Piccolotti instead faced Ray Wood and won the fight via submission in the first round. In his post-fight interview, Piccolotti dedicated the victory to Parsons.

In his highest profile fight in the promotion at the time, Piccolotti faced Brandon Girtz at Bellator 165 on November 19, 2016. He won the bout by unanimous decision.

Piccolotti faced Goiti Yamauchi at Bellator 183 on September 23, 2017. He lost the bout via rear-naked choke submission in the first round.

After receiving his first professional loss at the hands of Yamauchi, Piccolotti was expected to  make a quick return against Derek Anderson at Bellator 189 on December 1, 2017. Due to an injury, Piccolotti's opponent was changed to David Rickels. He lost the 160 lb catchweight fight by unanimous decision.

Piccolotti faced Carrington Banks at Bellator 199 on May 12, 2018. He won the fight via rear-naked choke submission in the third round.

Piccolotti faced James Terry on September 29, 2018, at Bellator at Bellator 206.  He won the fight via unanimous decision.

Piccolotti next faced Benson Henderson at Bellator 220 on April 27, 2019. He lost the fight via split decision. 8 out of 9 media scores gave it to Piccolotti.

Piccolotti faced Jacob Smith at Bellator 226. He won the bout via rear-naked choke in the second round.

Piccolotti faced Sidney Outlaw at Bellator 244 on August 21, 2020. He lost the bout via split decision. 2 out of 2 media scores gave it to Outlaw.

Piccolotti was expected to face Georgi Karakhanyan on May 21, 2021, at Bellator 259.However, Piccolotti pulled out due to injury.

Piccolotti was expected to face Saul Rogers on September 18, 2021, at Bellator 266. However, he pulled out of the bout due to unknown reasons.

Piccolotti faced Georgi Karakhanyan on February 19, 2022, at Bellator 274. He won the bout via unanimous decision. Piccolotti was then medically suspended by the Mohegan Tribe Department of Athletic Regulation after he posted a video of him vomiting in an attempt to cut weight prior to the fight; he was also fined $2,500, although the outcome of the match was not overturned.

Despite the Mohegan Tribe suspension, Piccolotti was scheduled to face Tofiq Musayev on July 22, 2022 at Bellator 283. Piccolotti however pulled out of the bout due to injury.

Piccolotti headlined Bellator 287 on October 29, 2022 against Mansour Barnaoui. He lost the bout in the second round via rear-naked choke.

Piccolotti, as a replacement for Jay Jay Wilson, is scheduled to face Mandel Nallo on March 31, 2023 at Bellator 293.

Mixed martial arts record

|-
|Loss
|align=center|13–5
|Mansour Barnaoui
|Submission (rear-naked choke)
|Bellator 287
|
|align=center|2
|align=center|2:51
|Milan, Italy
|
|-
|Win
|align=center|13–4
|Georgi Karakhanyan
|Decision (unanimous)
|Bellator 274
|
|align=center|3
|align=center|5:00
|Uncasville, Connecticut, United States
|
|-
|Loss
|align=center|12–4
|Sidney Outlaw
|Decision (split)
|Bellator 244
|
|align=center|3
|align=center|5:00
|Uncasville, Connecticut, United States
|
|-
|Win
|align=center|12–3
|Jacob Smith
|Submission (rear-naked choke)
|Bellator 226
|
|align=center| 2
|align=center| 2:34
|San Jose, California, United States
| 
|-
|Loss
|align=center|11–3
|Benson Henderson
|Decision (split)
|Bellator 220
|
|align=center|3
|align=center|5:00
|San Jose, California, United States
|
|-
|Win
|align=center|11–2
|James Terry
|Decision (unanimous)
|Bellator 206
|
|align=center|3
|align=center|5:00
|San Jose, California, United States
|Catchweight (160 lbs) bout.
|-
|Win
|align=center|10–2
|Carrington Banks
|Submission (rear-naked choke)
|Bellator 199
|
|align=center|3
|align=center|4:41
|San Jose, California, United States
|
|-
|Loss
|align=center|9–2
|David Rickels
|Decision (unanimous)
|Bellator 189
|
|align=center| 3
|align=center| 5:00
|Thackerville, Oklahoma, United States
| 
|-
|Loss
|align=center|9–1
|Goiti Yamauchi 
|Submission (rear-naked choke)
|Bellator 183
|
|align=center|1
|align=center|3:19
|San Jose, California, United States
|
|-
|Win
|align=center|9–0
|Brandon Girtz
|Decision (unanimous)
|Bellator 165
|
|align=center|3
|align=center|5:00
|San Jose, California, United States
|
|-
|Win
|align=center|8–0
|Ray Wood
|Submission (rear-naked choke)
|Bellator 154
|
|align=center|1
|align=center|3:17
|San Jose, California, United States
|
|-
|Win
|align=center|7–0
|Mario Soto
|Submission (rear-naked choke)
|Bellator 147
|
|align=center|2
|align=center|3:25
|San Jose, California, United States
|
|-
|Win
|align=center|6–0
|Salvador Becerra
|Submission (neck crank)
|Bellator MMA & Glory: Dynamite 1
|
|align=center|2
|align=center|1:47
|San Jose, California, United States
|
|-
|Win
|align=center|5–0
|Andrew Ramm
|Decision (unanimous)
|Bellator 133
|
|align=center|3
|align=center|5:00
|Fresno, California, United States
|
|-
|Win
|align=center|4–0
|Tristan Arenal
|Submission (rear-naked choke)
|Dragon House 18
|
|align=center|2
|align=center|3:33
|San Francisco, California, United States
| 
|-
|Win
|align=center|3–0
|Eugene Marenya
|TKO (punches)
|Dragon House 17
|
|align=center|3
|align=center|3:28
|San Francisco, California, United States
|
|-
|Win
|align=center|2–0
|Cody Orrison
|Decision (split)
|Dragon House 16
|
|align=center|3
|align=center|5:00
|San Francisco, California, United States
|
|-
|Win
|align=center|1–0
|Jeffery Peterson
|TKO (punches)
|Dragon House 15
|
|align=center|1
|align=center|4:04
|San Francisco, California, United States
|

See also
 List of current Bellator fighters

References

Living people
1988 births
American male mixed martial artists
Lightweight mixed martial artists
Mixed martial artists utilizing wrestling
Mixed martial artists utilizing Brazilian jiu-jitsu
People from Half Moon Bay, California
American male sport wrestlers
Amateur wrestlers
American practitioners of Brazilian jiu-jitsu
People awarded a black belt in Brazilian jiu-jitsu